Asthenocnemis is a genus of white-legged damselfly in the family Platycnemididae. There are at least two described species in Asthenocnemis.

Species
These two species belong to the genus Asthenocnemis:
 Asthenocnemis linnaei Gassmann & Hämäläinen, 2008
 Asthenocnemis stephanodera Lieftinck, 1949

References

Further reading

External links

 

Platycnemididae
Articles created by Qbugbot